This is list of senators in Brazil since its foundation in 1826 until the 52nd (last term of 2003-2007).

Senators of the Empire of Brazil (1826-1889)
After the declaration of Brazilian independence, the new monarch, Pedro I issued a new Constitution in 1824. The Constitution of the Empire made Brazil a monarchy centered on the figure of the emperor and divided into four branches: Executive (the monarch and his ministers), judicial (Judges), moderator (Emperor) and the legislative. Formed by the Senate and House of Representatives.

During the Empire of Brazil (1822—1889), All senators were appointed for life. Besides being for life, the office was unique Brazilian born or naturalized and required a minimum age of forty years and a minimum annual income of eight hundred thousand reis.

Each senator was appointed directly by Emperor, who was presented with a list of three candidates elected in the provinces by a majority vote and indirect. The representatives of the provinces in Imperial Senate were chosen by criteria such as experience in public office and also ennoblement.

The senators were considered "Augustan most worthy and honorable representatives of the Nation" and his office was a sign of important distinction for men dedicated to public life. Nearly all the senators had been general and provincial parliamentarians and more than half of them was a minister of state or governor of the province.

The Senate also included the princes belonging to the line of succession to the Brazilian throne - "the imperial princes Brazil". The princes of the Gran Para and Princes of Brazil - Under Article 46 of Constitution of the Empire of Brazil of 1824 were entitled to a seat in the upper house once they reached the age of twenty-five years. With this option, the Princess Isabel was the first female senator in Brazil - the only case of a royal Brazilian who managed to enjoy such a constitutional arrangement.

Senators of the República Velha (1889-1930)

The First Brazilian Republic or República Velha ("Old Republic") is the period of Brazilian history from 1889 to 1930. The República Velha ended with the Brazilian Revolution of 1930 that installed Getúlio Vargas as a dictator.

Senators in the Vargas era (1930-1945)

The Brazilian Revolution of 1930 marked the end of the Old Republic. President Washington Luís was deposed; the swearing-in of President-elect Julio Prestes was blocked, on the grounds that the election had been rigged by his supporters; the 1891 Constitution was abrogated, the National Congress was dissolved and the provisional military junta ceded power to Vargas. Federal intervention in State governments increased and the political landscape was altered by suppressing the traditional oligarchies of São Paulo and Minas Gerais states.

Senators of the Second Brazilian Republic (1945-1963)
The Second Brazilian Republic was marked by political instability and military's pressure on civilian politicians which ended with the 1964 Brazilian coup d'état and establishment of Brazilian military government. In 1945, President Getúlio Vargas was deposed by a bloodless military coup, but his influence in Brazilian politics remained until the end of the Second Republic. During this period, three parties dominated national politics. Two of them were pro-Vargas — the Brazilian Labour Party (Partido Trabalhista Brasileiro, PTB) to the left and the Social Democratic Party (Partido social Democrático, PSD) in the center — and another anti-Vargas, the rightist National Democratic Union (União Democrática Nacional, UDN).

Senators of the Military Regime (1964-1987) 

The Brazilian military government began with the 1964 coup d'état led by the Armed Forces against the administration of President João Goulart—who, having been vice-president, had assumed the office of president upon the resignation of the democratically elected president Jânio Quadros—and ended when José Sarney took office on March 15, 1985 as President.

Senators of the New Republic (1987-present)

External links
Official Website of the Senate

Lists of Brazilian politicians
List